Angaar may refer to:
 Angaar (1992 film), an Indian Hindi-language crime drama film
 Angaar (2016 film), an Indo-Bangladeshi romantic action musical film